Frederick William Enke (December 15, 1924 – April 13, 2014) was a professional American football quarterback who played in seven National Football League (NFL) seasons from 1948 to 1954 for the Detroit Lions, the Philadelphia Eagles, and the Baltimore Colts.  He started for the Lions for two years.  Enke played college football at the University of Arizona and was drafted in the seventh round of the 1948 NFL Draft.

Enke was inducted into the Arizona High School Sports Hall of Fame as an inaugural member in 2007.  He graduated from Tucson High School as a three-sport star (football, baseball, basketball) in 1943 after starting a 52-game winning streak for the school as quarterback.  He was a two-time All State quarterback leading the Badgers to the State Championship in all three sports during the 1942–43 school year. He was the first Arizonan to start as a quarterback in the NFL.

After leaving the NFL, Enke retired to Casa Grande, Arizona to become a cotton farmer.

Personal life
His father, Fred August Enke, was a college basketball coach.

Death
Fred Enke died in 2014 from dementia, aged 89, in Casa Grande, Arizona.

See also
 List of NCAA major college football yearly passing leaders
 List of NCAA major college football yearly total offense leaders

References

1924 births
2014 deaths
People from Casa Grande, Arizona
Sportspeople from the Phoenix metropolitan area
Basketball players from Tucson, Arizona
Basketball players from Louisville, Kentucky
Players of American football from Tucson, Arizona
Players of American football from Louisville, Kentucky
American football quarterbacks
Arizona Wildcats football players
Detroit Lions players
Philadelphia Eagles players
Baltimore Colts players
American men's basketball players
Arizona Wildcats men's basketball players
Deaths from dementia in Arizona